Lindell is an unincorporated community in Maries County, in the U.S. state of Missouri.

History
A post office called Lindell was established in 1884, and remained in operation until 1919. The community took its name from the Lindell Dry Goods Company, a company with which an early settler had business contacts.

References

Unincorporated communities in Maries County, Missouri
Unincorporated communities in Missouri